The 2011 Monmouth Hawks football team represented Monmouth University in the 2011 NCAA Division I FCS football season  as a member of the Northeast Conference (NEC). The Hawks were led by 19th-year head coach Kevin Callahan and played their home games at Kessler Field. 
They finished the season 5–6 overall and 4–4 in NEC play to tie for fourth place.

Schedule

References

Monmouth
Monmouth Hawks football seasons
Monmouth Hawks football